Tonetta is a given name, nickname and a surname. Notable people with this name include the following.

Nickname
Anthony Jeffrey, also known as Tonetta (born 1949), Canadian entertainer

Surname
Elena Tonetta (born 1988), Italian archer

Places
Tonetta Lake, American lake, located in Southeast, New York.

See also

Tonette (given name)